The Cumberland County Cup is the second oldest rugby league knock-out competition in the world after the Challenge Cup. It is open to every amateur club in the county of Cumberland and is administered by British Amateur Rugby League Association.

The first competition was held in 1902-03 and the winners were Brookland Rovers from the town of Maryport.

List of finals

See also

References

External links
 BARLA Official Website

BARLA competitions